The Battle of Las Piedras was fought on May 18, 1811 as part of the Uruguayan struggle for independence.

Background and development of events
In 1810, the May Revolution had forced the Spanish to abandon Buenos Aires, but they held on to the Banda Oriental (present-day Uruguay), as Spain moved the headquarters of the Viceroyalty of the Río de la Plata to Montevideo. At the beginning of April 1811, the revolutionary José Gervasio Artigas returned to the Banda Oriental with approximately 180 men provided by the Government of Buenos Aires. On April 11, he issued the Mercedes Proclamation, assuming control of the revolution.

The Governor of Montevideo, Francisco Javier de Elío, appointed frigate-captain  at the head of the forces loyal to Spain. Posadas installed his headquarters at San Isidro Labrador de Las Piedras near Montevideo, to provoke a decisive battle against the revolutionaries.

Meanwhile, José Artigas was camped near Nuestra Señora de Guadalupe with an army of a thousand men. The army of Posadas counted 1230 men, of which some 200 would defect to Artigas in the midst of battle.

The battle was fought on May 18 at Las Piedras and resulted in a total victory for the revolutionaries. José Posadas capitulated. It was at this occasion that Artigas pronounced his famous sentence "Curad a los heridos, clemencia para los vencidos" (Cure the injured, mercy to the vanquished), an unusual decision in those times, referring to the Spanish wounded and prisoners. One of the casualties on the revolutionary side was Manuel Artigas, nephew of José Artigas.

Both armies fought in the name of King Ferdinand VII of Spain.

Importance of the battle 
Some historians consider the victory in the Battle of Las Piedras as crucial for the survival of the revolution in Uruguay and Argentina, after the defeats of General Manuel Belgrano in Paraguay and Paraná.

After the battle, the Royalists remained in control of only Colonia del Sacramento and Montevideo, which was finally taken by Carlos María de Alvear on June 20, 1814.

The day of the battle, May 18, is now an official holiday in Uruguay. The date is also commemorated in the military and civilian honour, the 18 May 1811 Medal.

See also
 First Siege of Montevideo

External links
 Official website of the Bicentennial

Colonial Uruguay
Las Piedras 1811
Las Piedras
Las Piedras
Las Piedras
1811 in Uruguay
May 1811 events
Las Piedras, Uruguay